The Captain Mbaye Diagne Medal for Exceptional Courage is, along with the Dag Hammarskjöld Medal and the United Nations Medal, one of three awards of the United Nations, given to persons who have participated in the international humanitarian, military or police UN mission. It was founded on 8 May 2014 by the United Nations Security Council and is named after Mbaye Diagne, a  Senegalese Captain and Military Observer of the United Nations in Rwanda, who was killed in action in Rwanda on 31 May 1994. The first medal was awarded posthumously to Diagne. The medal was received by Diagne's widow and two children in the UN General Assembly Hall on 19 May 2016. After that, the medal was given for the first time in 2019, to Private Chancy Chitete, from the Malawian contingent of MONUSCO, killed during fighting against the Allied Democratic Forces. On 26 May 2022, the Captain Mbaye Diagne Medal was awarded posthumously to Captain Abdelrazakh Hamit Bahar of Chad for his bravery in a peacekeeping mission in Mali.

Award requirements and Design 
The medal is awarded, irrespective of the United Nations Medal, to persons who, while participating in a UN mission in an extremely dangerous situation, have shown extraordinary courage.

On the front side of the gold-coloured medal is the emblem of the United Nations with the stroke United Nations, Exceptional Courage, on the back the stroke Captain Mbaye Diagne Medal, in the Service of Peace. The ribbon is light blue-gold striped.

Notes

Awards established in 2014
Medals of the United Nations
United Nations peacekeeping